Jacob served as Greek Patriarch of Alexandria between 1861 and 1865.

References
 

19th-century Greek Patriarchs of Alexandria
People from Patmos
1803 births
1865 deaths